The 1790s BC was a decade lasting from January 1, 1799 BC to December 31, 1790 BC. During this decade, the Near East was in the midst of the Middle Bronze Age.

Going by the middle chronology, the Babylonian Empire saw the death of its king, Sin-Muballit in c. 1792 BC. He was succeeded by Hammurabi, who would go on to compose the Code of Hammurabi, the best-preserved legal text from the ancient Near East. Shamshi-Adad I, king of Assyria, continued his conquests, defeating Yahdun-Lim of Mari.

The Middle Kingdom of Egypt was ruled by the Thirteenth Dynasty at this time. The chronology of Pharaohs during this decade is uncertain, but Sonbef, Sekhemkare, Ameny Qemau, and Hotepibre have been suggested to rule during this decade.

The Cemetery H culture had developed by this time in northern India: distinguishing features of this culture include the use of cremation of human remains, reddish pottery, apparent breakdown of widespread trade, and rice farming. In China, the semi-legendary Xia Dynasty was the dominant political force, and was possibly ruled by Jin of Xia at this time.

Manning (2008) tentatively estimates the world population in 1799 BC as 85 million.

Events and trends

c. 1792 BC: Hammurabi starts to rule in Babylon, according to the middle chronology.

c. 1792 BC: Work begins on the Stela of Hammurabi (now in the Louvre, Paris).

Significant people
Rim-Sin I, King of Larsa (1822–1763 BC) (Middle Chronology)
Sin-Muballit, King of Babylon (1813–1792 BC) (Middle Chronology)
Sumu-Epuh, King of Yamhad (1810–1780 BC) (Middle Chronology)
Jin of Xia, semi-legendary Xia dynasty King of China (1810–1789 BC)
Shamshi-Adad I, Amorite King of Assyria (1809–1776 BC) (Middle Chronology)
Sonbef, Thirteenth Dynasty Pharaoh of Egypt (1800–1796 BC)
Nerikare, Thirteenth Dynasty Pharaoh of Egypt (1796 BC)
Sekhemkare, Thirteenth Dynasty Pharaoh of Egypt (1796–1793 BC)
Ameny Qemau, Thirteenth Dynasty Pharaoh of Egypt (1793–1791 BC)
Hammurabi, King of Babylon (1792–1750) (Middle Chronology)
Hotepibre, Thirteenth Dynasty Pharaoh of Egypt (1791–1788 BC)

Births
 Rim-Sin I, ruler of the Middle Eastern city-state of Larsa was born in circa 1790 B.C. according to Short Chronology estimates.

References

18th century BC